Pereyaslovka is a rural locality (a selo) and the administrative center of Pereyaslovky Selsoviet of Oktyabrsky District, Amur Oblast, Russia. The population was 57 as of 2018. There are 4 streets.

Geography 
Pereyaslovka is located 29 km west of Yekaterinoslavka (the district's administrative centre) by road. Urozhaynoye is the nearest rural locality.

References 

Rural localities in Oktyabrsky District, Amur Oblast